Varaztirots II Bagratuni (c. 590 – 645) was an Armenian nakharar from the Bagratuni family, the son of Smbat IV Bagratuni. He was marzpan of Armenia c. 628, fled to the Byzantine Empire soon thereafter and was exiled for several years to Africa for his participation in a plot against Heraclius. On his return c. 645/6, he was named curopalates and presiding prince of Armenia, but died before being formally invested.

Life 
Varaztirots was the eldest son of Smbat IV Bagratuni. Along with his brother Garikhpet, he grew up in the Sassanid Persian court of Khosrow II. Following the defeat of the rebellion of Vistahm, in which his father was instrumental, Varaztirots was named a royal cupbearer. At that point, or after Smbat's victory over the Hephthalites in 608, he also received the honorific name Javitean Khosrow ("Eternal Khosrow").

In 628, Khosrow II was overthrown after a conspiracy in which several aristocratic houses, including Varaztirots, took part. As a reward, the new Persian shah, Kavad II, appointed Varaztirots as marzpan of Armenia, with the rank of aspet. He soon quarrelled with the Persian governor of neighbouring Azerbaijan, however, and fled with his family to the Byzantine emperor Heraclius, who, following the end of the Byzantine–Sasanian War of 602–628, resided with his court in northern Mesopotamia. According to the Armenian chronicler Sebeos, Heraclius welcomed him with great honours, gave him valuable gifts and "exalted him above all the patricians of his kingdom". In 635 or 637, however, Varaztirots became involved in a conspiracy by several Armenian magnates to overthrow and murder Heraclius and replace him with his son, John Athalarichos. The conspiracy was uncovered, and Varaztirots was exiled to Africa; the treatment he received was more merciful than that of his co-conspirators as he had opposed the murder of the emperor.

On his death-bed in 641, Heraclius pardoned Varaztrots and made his successor, Constantine III, swear that he would recall him and his family from exile and restore their honours. In the event, Varaztirots was recalled only in 645/6, by Constans II at the urging of Theodore Rshtuni. Varaztirots quickly fled from Constantinople to Armenia, but after assurances of loyalty, Constans then appointed him governor of Armenia with the high rank of curopalates. Before he could be formally invested, however, he fell ill and died. He was buried next to his father at Dariwnk, in Kogovit.

References

Sources

Further reading
 
 

Bagratuni dynasty
7th-century rulers in Asia
Year of birth uncertain
590s births
640s deaths
Sasanian governors of Armenia
Byzantine prisoners and detainees
7th-century Armenian people
Kouropalatai
Armenian people from the Sasanian Empire